In 1956, Longuet-Higgins and Orgel predicted the existence of transition-metal cyclobutadiene complexes, in which the degenerate eg orbital of cyclobutadiene has the correct symmetry for π interaction with the dxz and dyz orbitals of the proper metal. The compound was synthesized three years after the prediction and it serves as a beautiful case of theory before experiment. This successful attempt opens the door for the formation of novel compounds containing other organic ligands which in their free state are highly reactive molecules. Of all those reactive molecules, trimethylenemethane (TMM) has the most natural derivation from the cyclobutadiene complexes and in 1966, Emerson and co-workers reported the first trimethylenemethane (TMM) transition metal complex, (CO)3FeC(CH2)3, which became the starting point of the legends of trimethylenemethane complexes. Some good reviews on this aspect could be served as further resources for this topic.

Synthesis of trimethylenemethane complexes 

Generally speaking, the trimethylenemethane complexes could be synthesized in the following four ways: (A) the dehalogenation of α, α'-dihalosubstituted precursors, (B) the thermal extrusion of XY (XY = HCl, Br2, and CH4,) from η3-methylallyl complexes, (C) the ring opening of alkylidenecyclopropanes, and (D) the elimination of Me3SiX [X = OAc, Cl, OS(O)2Me] from functionalized allylsilanes (Figure 1).

Dehalogenation of α, α'-dihalosubstituted precursors 

Tris(carbonyl)-η4-trimethylenemethaneiron(0) was the first trimethylenemethane metal complex to be synthesized and was obtained from the reaction of 3-chloro-2-chloromethylprop-1-ene with [Fe2(CO)9,] or Na2[Fe(CO)4]. Followed by this result, A number of substituted trimethylenemethane iron complexes have been prepared by similar methods to those used to prepare tris(carbonyl)-η4-trimethylenemethaneiron(0).

Thermal extrusion from η3-methylallyl complexes 
This reaction was first reported by Emerson.The iron allyl complex, obtained from the reaction of 3-chloro-2-methylprop-1-ene with [Fe2(CO)9], decomposed on heating to afford the iron trimethylenemethane complex.

Ring opening of alkylidenecyclopropanes 

In the presence of [Fe2(CO)9], the ring opening of 2-substituted methylenecyclopropanes leads to the formation of various η4-trimethylenemethane complexes containing different functional groups, such as (R1 = H, R2 = Ph), (R1 = Me, R2 = Ph), (R1 = R2 = Ph), and (R1 = H, R2 = CH=CH2). The most interesting part of this strategy is the stereochemistry and it had been elucidated by stereospecific deuterium labeling experiments. (Figure 3)

Elimination of Me3SiX [X = OAc, Cl, OS(O)2Me] from functionalized allylsilanes 

The use of [Pd(PPh3)4] to facilitate the elimination of Me3SiX (X=OAc) and generate a highly reactive η3-trimethylenemethane palladium was first reported by Trost and Chan. Subsequently, it was discovered that the reaction of allylsilanes with a d8 metal center proceeds via oxidative addition to the metal, resulting in the formation of an η1-allyl complex, followed by the formation of an η3-allyl complex, and finally elimination of Me3SiX to yield the η4-trimethylenemethane complex  (Figure 4). The isolation of the proposed intermidate further confirmed the mechanism.

Structure and bonding

Structure conformation 
In a study using gas phase electron diffraction, it was determined that tris(carbonyl)-η4-trimethylenemethaneiron adopts a staggered conformation about the iron center. The ligands, which include carbonyl and a trigonal-pyramidal trimethylenemethane, are arranged in the usual umbrella-type configuration. The central carbon of the trimethylenemethane ligand is closer to the iron center compared to the outer methylene carbons. This was confirmed by the Fe-C(central) distance measuring 1.94(1) Å, while the Fe-CH distances were measured at 2.12 Å. These findings are presented in Figure 5.  Moreover, this result has also been confirmed by X-ray diffraction and vibrational spectrum.

Bonding analysis 

The orbital interaction diagram presented in Figure 6a illustrates the key bonding interaction in a complex formed between a planar trimethylenemethane ligand and an Fe(CO)3 fragment in a staggered geometry. Specifically, the diagram highlights that the primary bonding interaction occurs between the 2e set of the Fe(CO)3 fragment and e" on the trimethylenemethane ligand. However, if the metal-trimethylenemethane axis is rotated by 60° into an eclipsed geometry, the interaction between 2e and e" is reduced. This reduction results in an increase in the energy of the HOMO in the complex, which is a significant factor that provides a barrier to rotation, as shown in Figure 6b.

Extended Huckel calculations give a barrier of  87 KJ mol−1 using a planar trimethylenemethane ligand. Introducing a puckered conformation to the trimethylenemethane ligand, which resembles the experimental geometry, leads to an increase in the calculated barrier to 98.6 kJ mol−1. This puckering induces mixing of s character into e" orbitals, causing a more pronounced orientation toward the metal center. Consequently, the overlap between e" and 2e orbitals is enhanced. The degree of puckering, characterized by θ, falls within the range of 12°. The mixing of s character into e" also results in the H-C-H  plane being tipped away from the metal. The angle β, between C-1 and C-2  and the plane H-C-H,  is typically about 15°.

Reactions of η4-Trimethylenemethane Complexes 
As a charming complex posseing many interesting properties, trimethylenemethane complexes are found to have reactions with: (A) electrophiles; (B) nucleophiles; (C) tertiary phosphines; and the complexes could also have (D) redox reactions.

Reactions with electrophiles 
With a good π system, iron trimethylenemethane complexes are susceptible to electrophilic attack. The addition of hydrochloric acid to tris(carbonyl)-η4-trimethylenemethaneiron yields chlorotris(carbonyl)-2-methylallyliron(Ⅱ). Substituted trimethylenemethane iron complexes, on the other hand, react with strong acids to produce cross-conjugated dienyl iron cations and η4-diene complexes.

Reactions with nucleophiles 
The same as the reactions with electronphiles, the cationic molybdenum trimethylenemethane complex has been found to exhibit susceptibility to nucleophilic attack at the trimethylenemethane ligand. This leads to the formation of neutral η3-allyl complexes.

Reactions with tertiary phosphines 
The cationic complex [Ir{η4-C(CH2)3}(CO)(PPh3)2]PF6 (complex 1) exhibits rapid reactivity towards various tertiary phosphine ligands at room temperature. Upon treatment with 1 mol equivalent of ethyldiphenylphosphine, a 1:1:1 mixture of complexes  [Ir{η4-C(CH2)3}(CO)(PMePh2)2]PF6 (complex 2),  [Ir{η4-C(CH2)3}(CO)(PMePh2)(PPh3)]PF6 (complex 3), and  [Ir{η4-C(CH2)3}(CO)(PPh3)2]PF6 (complex 1) is formed. Addition of 2 mol equivalents of methyldiphenylphosphine to complex 1 affords complex complex 2 in high yield. Similarly, complex 1 reacts with 1,2-bis(diphenylphosphino)ethane (dppe) to yield [Ir{η4-C(CH2)3}(CO)dppe]PF6. These reactions demonstrate that the phosphine ligands in these cationic iridium complexes are labile. Moreover, addition of 1 mol equivalent of methyldiphenylphosphine to the complex [Ir{η4-C(CH2)3}(CO)2(PPh3)]PF6 displaces a carbonyl ligand, yielding a 1:1:1 mixture of complexes 1,2 and 3.

Redox reactions 

Up to now, redox reactions of trimethylenemethane complexes are still limited. One iconic example is the electron-rich  complexes  [Fe{η4-C(CH2)3(L)3]  (L = PMe or PMe2Ph) (complex 4). Upon oxidation with 1 equivalent of silver trifluoromethanesulfonate, the neutral trimethylenemethane complexes 4 undergo transformation into their respective cationic 17-electron complexes 5. These green oxidation complexes,  can be regenerated back to their original neutral trimethylenemethane forms through reactions with sodium diethylmalonate or sodium borohydride (Figure 7).

References 

Coordination complexes